Takht-e Bastam-e Sofla (also Romanized as Takht-e Basţām-e Soflá) is a village in Bijnavand Rural District, in the Zagros District of Chardavol County, Ilam Province, Iran. At the 2006 census, its population was 33, in 9 families. The village is populated by Kurds.

References 

Populated places in Chardavol County
Kurdish settlements in Ilam Province